Places in the Heart is a 1984 American film written and directed by Robert Benton. It stars Sally Field, Lindsay Crouse, Ed Harris, Ray Baker, Amy Madigan, John Malkovich, Danny Glover, Jerry Haynes and Terry O'Quinn. The film's narrative follows Edna Spalding, a young woman during the Great Depression in Texas who is forced to take charge of her farm after the death of her husband and is helped by a motley bunch.

Places in the Heart premiered at the 35th Berlin International Film Festival, where it competed for the Golden Bear, while Benton won the Silver Bear for Best Director. It  was theatrically released on September 21, 1984, by Tri-Star Pictures to critical and commercial success. Reviewers praised Benton's screenplay and direction and performances of the cast (particularly of Field, Malkovich and Crouse), while the film grossed $34.9 million against a $9.5 million budget. The film received seven nominations at the 57th Academy Awards including for the Best Picture and won two: Best Actress (for Field), and Best Original Screenplay.

Plot
It is 1935 in Waxahachie, Texas, a small town in the grip of the Great Depression. One Sunday afternoon, the sheriff, Royce Spalding, goes to investigate gun shots at the rail yards. A cheerfully drunk black teenager, Wylie, is firing a revolver. He reaches an empty chamber and, thinking the gun is empty, he aims at the sheriff, killing him.  Royce's body is brought home to his widow, Edna, and their children. A truckload of vigilantes drags Wylie's body behind them, stopping in front of the Spalding house. Later, Wylie's friends take his body down from a tree. The two men are buried on the same day.

Edna must now raise her children alone. She is comforted by her sister, Margaret, who helps with the funeral. A drifter and handyman, a black man named Moses “Moze” Hadner appears at her door the night of the funeral, asking for work. He offers to plant cotton on her 40 acres, citing his  experience. Edna feeds him and sends him on his way. The next morning, she finds him chopping wood in her yard. She makes him breakfast. Moze steals some silver spoons and goes.

The bank has a note on the family farm, and the price for cotton is plummeting. The local banker, Albert Denby, insists she needs to sell the farm.

When the police find Moze with her silver, they bring him back to confirm the theft, Edna says she has hired him and explains the spoons. The next day, Edna tells Denby she will not sell the farm. He is appalled that she is taking advice from a black man. Later, he visits the farm and forces her to take his brother-in-law, Will, blinded in World War I, as a paid lodger. 

Frank gets caught smoking at school. Edna is forced into yet another male role previously performed by her husband, as she must punish Frank. Edna gathers instructions from Frank as to the way she should spank him; she hesitates, then delivers the punishment while Moze and Possum empathize from outside. Frank takes his spanking bravely, while Edna confides to Will that she will not do this again and that she dearly misses her husband.

Will is slow to warm up to Edna's children, but they eventually become close. He rescues her daughter, Possum, during a tornado that levels part of town but leaves the Spalding house standing.

Wayne Lomax, Edna's brother-in-law, has a fine time making love to married schoolteacher Viola Kelsey. The tornado is the last straw for Viola, who tells her husband they must move. Wayne admits the affair to Margaret. She says she won't forgive him this time.

Edna realizes she cannot make the next payment even if she sells all her cotton. She learns of an Ellis County contest: a $100 cash prize to the farmer who produces the first bale of cotton for market each season. Edna realizes the prize money plus the proceeds from the sale of her cotton would be enough to save the farm. Moze helps her find the pickers they need to harvest the cotton on time.

Their efforts pay off. Edna and Moze find themselves first in line at the wholesaler with the season's first bale of cotton. Moze carefully coaches Edna on how to negotiate with the buyer, and as a result he is unable to cheat her. Edna makes plans for the future.  Moze is excited, but that  night, he is accosted by Ku Klux Klan members. Wielding Frank's gun, Will interrupts the savage beating. He recognizes all the assailants' voices and identifies them. They leave.  Weeping, Moze realizes he must leave the farm or die. He gives Edna a handkerchief that belonged to his mother.

The film's ending moves into a spiritual realm, evoking Holy Communion. A choir sings in the modest church, where the pews are mostly empty. During a reading of 1 Corinthians 13, Margaret takes Wayne's hand. The congregation—after filling the pews—partakes in Protestant communion, passing the elements of the ritual to each other and the choir sings “In the Garden”. The camera shows townspeople in the pews who were seen throughout the film, including a woman who died when the tornado overturned her car. Eventually, Moze is shown in the church, long fled; the camera then shows Edna, who passes a communion tray to her dead husband, quietly saying “Peace of God”; with the same blessing, he hands it to Wylie, who shot him and was also shot dead. After Wylie replies, “Peace of God”, the camera lingers on the two men in contemplation as the hymn ends and before the credits roll.

Cast

Production

Regarding the unique ending, writer-director Robert Benton explained why he ended an otherwise realistic movie with a fantasy scene incorporating equality, grace and forgiveness; tenets of Christianity:

"There are certain things images can explain that words cannot. There is something in the image of the man who has been killed handing the communion plate to the boy who killed him that seems very moving to me in ways I cannot explain. I had the ending before I ever finished the screenplay, although I knew audiences would be confused by it."

Release
Places in the Heart was released in theatres on September 21, 1984. The film was released on DVD on October 9, 2001, by Sony Pictures Home Entertainment.

Reception

Box office
Places in the Heart grossed $274,279 in its opening weekend. The film grossed $34.9 million in the US.

Critical response
Review aggregator Rotten Tomatoes gives the film a score of 89% based on reviews from 38 critics and a rating average of 8.00/10. The consensus is: "Places in the Heart is a quiet character piece with grand ambitions that it more than fulfills, thanks to absorbing work from writer-director Robert Benton and a tremendous cast." Metacritic gives the film a score of 70% based on reviews from 12 critics, indicating "generally favorable reviews."

Vincent Canby of The New York Times wrote in his review: "Robert Benton has made one of the best films in years about growing up American." Canby called it "moving and often funny" and "a tonic, a revivifying experience right down to the final images", comparing it to Luis Buñuel's Tristana". Roger Ebert gave the movie three of four stars, writing that Benton's "memories provide the material for a wonderful movie, and he has made it, but unfortunately he hasn't stopped at that. He has gone on to include too much. He tells a central story of great power, and then keeps leaving it to catch us up with minor characters we never care about."

Accolades
In 1985, when Sally Field accepted her second Academy Award for Best Actress (the first was for Norma Rae), she uttered the memorable (and much-mocked) line "I can't deny the fact that you like me—right now, you like me!" It is commonly misquoted as "You like me—you really like me!"

The film is recognized by American Film Institute in these lists:
 2006: AFI's 100 Years...100 Cheers – #95

References

Sources

External links

 
 
 

1984 films
1984 drama films
American drama films
1980s English-language films
Films about agriculture
Films about farmers
Films about race and ethnicity
Films directed by Robert Benton
Films featuring a Best Actress Academy Award-winning performance
Films featuring a Best Drama Actress Golden Globe-winning performance
Films set in 1935
Films set on farms
Films set in Texas
Films shot in Texas
Films whose writer won the Best Original Screenplay Academy Award
Great Depression films
Films with screenplays by Robert Benton
TriStar Pictures films
Films about the Ku Klux Klan
Films about blind people
1980s American films
Toronto International Film Festival People's Choice Award winners